"Valentino" (stylized in all caps) is a song by American rapper 24kGoldn, released on January 25, 2019. It is the lead single from his debut EP Dropped Outta College, and was produced by BlackMayo. The song, which is about 24kGoldn wanting money and valuable possessions over love, went viral on TikTok. Considered his breakout hit, it became his first song to chart on the Billboard Hot 100, peaking at 92. On January 3, 2020, a remix of the song featuring American rapper Lil Tjay was released. And on June 11, 2020, another remix featuring production from Kazakh DJ Imanbek, was released.

Charts

Certifications

References

2019 singles
2019 songs
24kGoldn songs
Trap music songs
Columbia Records singles
Songs written by 24kGoldn